Paul McBeth (born July 9, 1990) is an American professional disc golfer from Huntington Beach, California. He won the PDGA World Championships four times in a row (2012, 2013, 2014, and 2015) and again in 2019 and 2022, making him a six-time champion. He has not finished outside the top 2 at a World championship for the past 10 years. McBeth was the top rated player of the PDGA in 2015, 2017, 2018, and again in 2019.  He is widely considered to be the best disc golfer of the modern era. 

McBeth turned pro in 2008. His career earnings are $652,124.09 (as of September 2022). He proposed to Hannah Croke in April 2017 and got married in December 2018.

Professional career 
Although he played his first professional event in 2006, McBeth's professional career began in 2008, when he played in 29 professional events, netting $11,852.50 in winnings and earning the PDGA Male Rookie of the Year Award. Along with his six World titles, McBeth has received the PDGA Male Player of the year three times (2013, 2014, 2015). On October 8, 2019 McBeth held a PDGA rating of 1060 which, at the time, was the highest rating ever achieved by a professional disc golfer. This was exceeded on March 13, 2020, when he was rated 1061.

2014 season 
During McBeth's 2014 campaign, he competed in 25 tournaments which netted him $40,907. Of the 25 tournaments he competed in, McBeth won 15, placed 2nd in 5, and 3rd in 3. McBeth's worst finish of the year was 6th place, which happened twice. He took home many key trophies and topped it off with a World Championship. 

In the Memorial Championship, a National Tour event, McBeth bested Johne McCray by 4 strokes after coming into the final round tied. His final round performance netted him $4,000. 

McBeth also took down two majors. First, McBeth was able to net himself $4,412 and the win in the European Masters by shooting the hot round of -12. Due to his heroic final round, McBeth was able to beat second place finisher Karl Johan Nybo by 4 strokes. 

The second major McBeth won during the 2014 season was the coveted PDGA World Championship. McBeth contributed to one of the most exciting World Championships in recent memory. He and Ricky Wysocki were tied after the final hole resulting in a sudden-death playoff. The playoff would go to five holes as the two elites would battle it out. McBeth ended up taking home the World Championship and the $5,000 prize that came with it.

2015 season
McBeth dominated the 2015 season, winning 19 of 25 events by an average of almost 6 strokes and finishing in the top 3 in every event. He won all five Major events, disc golf's first Grand Slam, including his fourth World title and his first ever win at the USDGC, making him only the third man to win both the World and US titles in the same year (after Ken Climo and Barry Schultz). McBeth also took home three NT wins and earned enough points to win the National Tour for the fourth straight year.

2016 season
2016 started off looking like a continuation of McBeth's commanding 2015 season. After winning a B-Tier event in California, McBeth won the Memorial Championship (NT), followed by the La Mirada Open, the first event of the Disc Golf World Tour (DGWT). At the Nick Hyde Memorial (A-Tier), McBeth lost in a sudden death playoff with Nate Sexton and Simon Lizotte, who went on to win the event. Over the next three events, McBeth lost the Glass Blown Open (NT) by one stroke to Cam Todd, the Konopiste Open (DGWT) in a playoff to Lizotte, and the Masters Cup by one stroke to Ricky Wysocki on a 70-foot putt. Citing knee pain as the reason for his falling putting percentage, McBeth switched to a straddle stance for the European Open (DGWT), an event he has not lost since 2011. The switch was effective, and McBeth bested Wysocki by two strokes to win the event. Back home in the United States, however, McBeth's struggles continued. He placed 3rd in the Beaver State Fling (NT), and then tied for 12th place in the Vibram Open (NT), his lowest finish in three years. After another one stroke loss to Wysocki at the European Masters (DGWT), McBeth took another 12th-place finish at the Majestic. Wysocki continued his incredible season with his first World title, beating McBeth by 6 strokes and ending his 4-year winning streak. Feeling healthy and his form back in check, McBeth took a commanding  12 stroke win at the Ledgestone Insurance Open the next week, followed by an 11 stroke victory at the Brent Hambrick Memorial Open (NT). McBeth finished the National Tour in second place behind Wysocki, ending another 4-year streak. At the end of the inaugural Disc Golf Pro Tour, McBeth placed 4th in the Green Mountain Championship, resulting in a 5th-place finish in the points standings and an automatic berth into the Tour Championship semifinals, which he would go on to win. McBeth donated his $10,000 winnings from the Tour Championship to help pay medical bills for his cousin, who was injured in an accident. The 2016 season ended on a low note for McBeth: he finished in 20th place at the USDGC, shooting 2 over par after 3 rounds (the final round was cancelled due to Hurricane Matthew). Additionally, a scoring error in round 3 resulted in a two stroke penalty. Without the two stroke error, McBeth would have finished in 14th place, earning enough points to win the inaugural Disc Golf World Tour, but he instead took second place to Wysocki by just 75 points.

2017 season
McBeth entered a total of 24 tournaments  in 2017, winning 9 of them, and placing 2nd or 3rd in 12 others. His only major win of the season came at the European Open in Nokia, Finland, where he bested Gregg Barsby by only one stroke. For the second consecutive year, he finished runner-up to Ricky Wysocki in the 2017 PDGA Professional Disc Golf World Championships. McBeth's hottest streak of the season came during the spring months of March through May, where he won 5 of the 7 tournaments he entered and placed 2nd in the other two. Notable tournaments won during this streak were the DGPT Memorial Championship, the Nick Hyde Memorial, the Glass Blown Open, and the Masters Cup presented by Innova Disc Golf.

He notably had to withdraw from a significant tournament, Discraft's Green Mountain Championship, citing back pain. After posting a very un-McBeth-like 5-over par through only 13 holes during round 2, he decided to withdraw rather than face a prolonged injury. “Yeah, I hurt [my back] yesterday but didn’t know how bad until today,” McBeth said in a text message. “Couldn’t throw well so tried to play it out but it got too painful. Different spot [than my previous back injury] so I’m hoping it’s not too bad. If it was the final day probably would have tried to finish it. Way too much golf left to push it with USDGC next.”  He would end up finishing 3rd in the USDGC Championship three weeks later.

For the season, he pocketed $69,425 in winnings, including a $10,000 payout for winning the PDGA National Tour Elite Series.

2018 season
Paul McBeth's 2018 campaign was very similar to 2017 in terms of the number of tournaments he entered and won. Out of his 25 tournament appearances, McBeth notched 9 wins and finished 2nd or 3rd in 9 others.

His only major win of the year was the USDGC Championship on the Winthrop University Gold Course in Rock Hill, South Carolina. It was his 2nd USDGC victory (previous win was in 2015). McBeth got off to a blistering start, jumping out to a 7-stroke lead over James Conrad after two rounds. Conrad would eventually close the gap and tie McBeth after he cooled off over the final two rounds, but McBeth prevailed with a -34 to Conrad's -31. Relative newcomer Kevin Jones, who came within one stroke of tying McBeth on the back nine, eventually finished 3rd, four strokes back. This tournament was also notable for the fact that it featured live online coverage with Paul McBeth's wife Hannah providing on-course commentary.

On July 7, 2018 he had a historic round when he recorded a score of 18 under par (in 18 holes) during the second round on the Toboggan Course at the Great Lakes Open (McBeth would cruise to victory in the tournament). It was called "Near Perfect" and the round was featured on ESPN's SportsCenter.

Disc Golf video specialists Jomez Pro commemorated the round with this video.

In all, McBeth finished with $57,880.00 for the season. His other important tournament victories in 2018 included the Nick Hyde Memorial, the inaugural San Francisco Open, the Delaware Disc Golf Challenge, and The Ed Headrick Disc Golf Hall of Fame Classic (National Tour Finale).

Near the end of 2018 McBeth signed a 4-year deal with Discraft.

2019 season 
In 2019, McBeth played in 23 tournaments. Out of the 23 tournaments he won 14, placed 2nd in 5, and finished in the top 10 for the remaining tournaments, except for the United States Disc Golf Championship where he finished 64th. Mcbeth won $57,273 in prize money during his 2019 campaign. He took down some key tournaments throughout the season. McBeth bested Ricky Wysocki and Eagle McMahon by one stroke in the Glass Blown Open, a national tour event.  He won the European Open, held in Nokia, Finland, beating Eagle McMahon by two strokes. 

Mcbeth added his fifth world title in 2019. The 2019 Professional Disc Golf World Championships was held in Eureka, Illinois. McBeth went into the final round with a 6 stroke lead on Ricky Wysocki. He was able to shoot a -9 final round in order to hold off Wysocki by one stroke to win the title. This world title win netted Mcbeth $10,000.00 in prize money.

2020 season 
The 2020 season saw many tournament delays and cancellations due to the Coronavirus pandemic. During the modified season, McBeth played in 14 tournaments. He won 5 tournaments, placed second in 4, and placed top 10 in the remaining. McBeth won $32,729 in prize money during the 2020 season. 

McBeth won two key Disc Golf Pro Tour tournaments during the 2020 season. First, McBeth won the Dynamic Discs Open (formerly the Glass Blown Open) and took home $4,000. This event was the played on CBS Sports Network, making it the first disc golf tournament to be played on a major sports network. In this event, he was able to hold off Calvin Heimburg by one stroke. McBeth shot the best round in both rounds 1 and 2, shooting -11 and -12 respectively.

He also took down the MVP Open, held at Maple Hill. McBeth also claimed $4,000 in prize money for his win. In this event, McBeth was able to beat Ricky Wysocki by 4 strokes to claim the trophy. Wysocki held a two stroke lead going into the final round. However, McBeth was able to put together a final round best -10 performance.

2021 season
In February 2021, McBeth signed a 10-year deal with Discraft, worth $10 million.

October 9th 2021, McBeth won his 3rd US Disc Golf Championship in Rock Hill, South Carolina. Paul McBeth finished -26 tied with Kyle Klein whom he bested in a 1 round playoff.

Professional wins (139 total) 
McBeth has a total of 139 wins, including 6 World Championships, 11 other Majors, and 24 National Tour events. He won the PDGA National Tour in 2012, 2013, 2014, 2015, and 2017 and won the Disc Golf Pro Tour Championship in 2016.

PDGA Pro World Championships (6)

Other Majors (11) 

Majors playoff record (3-2)

National Tour (20) 

National Tour Wins: 2012, 2013, 2014, 2015, 2017

NT playoff record (1-3)

Summary 

*As of October 9, 2016

Annual statistics

†At Year End

Sponsorship 
McBeth was sponsored by Innova Champion Discs from 2005 to 2018. On November 19, 2018, McBeth announced that he would be sponsored by Discraft for the 2019 season, announcing a 4 year $1 Million deal. In 2021, it was determined he had already outgrown this deal through disc sales and overall value to the company, so his sponsorship was extended for an additional 10 years, for $10 million. 

Additionally, Mcbeth is sponsored by Grip Equipment and Foundation Disc Golf, of which he is a former part owner with Brodie Smith.

In the recent past McBeth has also accepted paid partnerships with Celsius Energy drinks and Adidas Terrex, however the specifics of these deals are not public as of now.

References

Statement from Innova Co-Founders Dave Dunipace and Harold Duvall

American disc golfers
Living people
1990 births
Sportspeople from Huntington Beach, California